Arnold Berliner (Gut Mittelneuland bei Neisse, 26 December 1862 – Berlin, 22 March 1942) was a German physicist.

Biography 

Berliner graduated in physics from the University of Breslau in 1886. He worked in the research and development laboratories of the Allgemeine Elektrizitäts-Gesellschaft (AEG).

Around the middle of 1912 he was appointed by the publishing firm Springer Verlag, Berlin as editor of the new scientific magazine Naturwissenschaften, inspired by the prestigious British scientific journal Nature, first published in November 1869. Naturwissenschaften began publication in January 1913. He became a good friend of immunologist Paul Ehrlich and chemist Richard Willstätter.

Nazi Germany and suicide 

Berliner was dismissed on 13 August 1935, from the journal he had founded 22 years earlier because of the racial policies on "non-Aryans" implemented by the Nazi government. The decision was reported in Nature (See Nature 136, 506-506; 28 September 1935), which editorialized:

Berliner committed suicide the day before an evacuation order (meaning deportation to an extermination camp) became effective.

Honors 

In 1933, the main-belt asteroid 1018 Arnolda, discovered at Heidelberg Observatory by Karl Reinmuth, was named after Berliner on the occasion of his 70th birthday.

References 
 

 Abraham Pais, (Amsterdam, The Netherlands, 1918 - Copenhagen, Denmark,  2000). Dutch-American Jewish Nuclear Physicist, "Subtle is the Lord—": The science and the life of Albert Einstein, (Oxford University Press, 1982), . .  Category: Philosophy,  and its sequel, Einstein Lived Here (Clarendon Press/Oxford University Press, 1994), . Albert Einstein, (1879–1955) was very close, intellectually speaking, to Arnold Berliner.
 A brief obituary notice was published in Nature 150, 284-284 (5 September 1942).
 Fritz Stern, Einstein's German World, Princeton University Press, (1999).

1862 births
1942 suicides
20th-century German physicists
19th-century German physicists
Members of the Prussian Academy of Sciences
University of Breslau alumni
Suicides in Germany
19th-century German Jews
Jewish physicists
Suicides by Jews during the Holocaust
German Jews who died in the Holocaust